The following is a list of locations in the Somerset Levels, England.

Settlements

 Aller, Somerset
 Alhampton
 Andersea
 Athelney
 Baltonsborough
 Banwell
 Barrow (North/South)
 Bawdrip
 Berrow
 Biddisham
 Blackford, near Wedmore
 Bleadon
 Bourton
 Brent Knoll
 Bridgwater
 Burnham-on-Sea
 Burrowbridge
 Burtle
 Butleigh
 Catcott
 Catsham
 Claverham
 Chapel Allerton
 Cheddar
 Chilton Polden
 Cocklake
 Cossington
 Curry Rivel
 Dunball
 Draycott
 Drayton
 Edington
 Foddington
 Glastonbury
 Greinton
 Highbridge
 Huish Episcopi
 Huntspill (East/West)
 Ilchester
 Langport
 Long Load
 Lovington
 Lympsham
 Mark 
 Meare
 Midelney
 Middlezoy
 Moorlinch
 Muchelney
 Nailsea
 North Curry
 Northmoor Green
 Nythe
 Oath
 Othery
 Pathe
 Pawlett
 Pedwell
 Podimore
 Puriton
 Rackley
 Rooks Bridge
 Shapwick
 Sharpham
 Somerton
 Southway
 Stathe
 Stawell
 Steart
 Sticklinch
 Stoke St Gregory
 Street
 Thorney
 Yatton
 Yeovil Marsh
 Weare
 Wedmore
 Westhay
 Weston-super-Mare
 Westonzoyland
 Wick St Lawrence
 Wookey
 Woolavington

Areas

 Aller and Beer Woods
 Aller Hill
 Aller Moor
 Allerton Moor
 Ascott Heath
 Bleadon Level
 Burnham Level
 Butleigh Moor
 Butt Moor
 Cary Moor
 Catcott, Edington and Chilton Moors SSSI
 Catcott Heath
 Catcott Lows
 Cheddar Moor
 Crannel Moor
 Curry and Hay Moors
 Draycott Moor
 Earlake Moor
 Edington Heath
 Glastonbury Heath
 Godney Moor
 Ham Wall
 Hearty Moor
 Holly Moor
 Horsey Level
 Huntspill Level
 Huntspill Moor
 Kennard Moor
 Kings Moor
 King's Sedgemoor
 Knowle Moor
 Lower Salt Moor
 Mark Moor
 Meare Heath
 Meare Pool
 Middle Moor
 Monk Moor
 Moorlinch SSSI
 Muchelney Level
 North Curry Meadow
 North Moor
 Oxmoor
 Panborough Moor
 Perry Moor
 Pill Moor
 Puriton Level
 Queen's Sedgemoor
 Rise Moor
 Shapwick Heath
 Shapwick Moor
 Sharpham Moor Plot
 Somerton Moor
 South Moor
 Southlake Moor
 Splotts Moor
 Stan Moor
 Stock Moor
 Stoke Moor
 Tealham and Tadham Moors
 Thorney Moor
 Walton Heath
 Wedmoor Moor
 West Sedgemoor
 Westbury Moor
 Westhay Heath
 Westhay Level
 Westhay Moor
 Weston Level
 West Moor SSSI, Somerset
 Wet Moor
 Woolavington Level

Rivers

 Bearley Brook
 Black Ditch
 Cannington Brook
 Chinnock Water
 Cobb's Cross Stream
 Decoy Rhine
 Eighteen Foot Rhine
 Hamp Brook
 Horsey Pill
 King's Sedgemoor Drain
 Lopen Brook
 Lox Yeo
 North Drain
 North Moor Main Drain
 Oldbridge River
 Pillrow Cut
 River Axe
 River Banwell
 River Brue
 River Cam
 River Cary
 River Huntspill
 River Isle
 River Parrett
 River Sheppey
 River Tone
 River Yeo (Ivel)
 Sedgemoor Old Rhine
 South Drain
 Sowy River
 Whitelake River

Railway stations
 Highbridge and Burnham railway station
 Bridgwater railway station

 list
Somerset Levels